Damian Joseph Kulash Jr. (born October 7, 1975) is an American musician, singer, songwriter and music video director, best known for being the lead singer and guitarist of the American rock band OK Go.

Early life and education
Kulash was born in Washington D.C. on October 7, 1975. Kulash graduated from St. Albans School in 1994. He trained as a youth at the Interlochen Arts Camp. The family name was originally "Kulas" when Kulash's great-grandparents lived in Poland. In a podcast, Kulash states that one of his grandfathers invented the modern day fish stick, and the other found a species of beetle.

While in college at Brown, Kulash played in at least three bands – A La Playa, Calixto Chinchile, and Square. He released three CDs in his senior year: an album of experimental Elvis covers (for his senior project), an eponymously titled five-song EP from his electronic pop band Square, and Appendices, a collection of more than a dozen miscellaneous recordings from his time in college, including solo songs, collaborations with friends, class projects, studio experiments, and recordings from previous bands. Included on the Appendices record are the original recordings of "Bye Bye Baby", which was later re-recorded for OK Go's debut record, and four songs from a never-finished EP for his punk band A La Playa.

In May 1998, Kulash won Brown University's Weston Prize in music composition. Kulash graduated from Brown University in 1998, with a concentration in Art-Semiotics.

Musical career
As a result of courses he took in electronic music, Kulash became interested in more highly produced, carefully crafted music. After graduation from Brown, Kulash moved to Chicago, and in 1998 formed OK Go. After playing in Chicago and appearances on NPR's This American Life, OK Go signed to Capitol Records. They have released four albums: OK Go, Oh No, Of the Blue Colour of the Sky, and Hungry Ghosts.
Prior to this, in 1996, he was in a band named Calixto Chinchile in which he played an early version of the OK Go song, ″Hello My Treacherous Friends.″

He was greatly influenced by many bands from the Washington D.C. area, such as Fugazi, Ted Leo and the Pharmacists, and Lungfish. He is also a fan of post-hardcore and indie rock. He was also one half of the Washington, D.C. based independent record label Level Records (1994–1996). Level Records released various 7"s, compilations, and CDs for bands such as Branch Manager and Frodus.

On March 9, 2010, Kulash announced OK Go's departure from EMI via their YouTube channel. Their new label is called Paracadute.

In August 2006, Kulash appeared on an episode of The Colbert Report to discuss the band putting their music videos on YouTube instead of going through the normal corporate video-making process. OK Go made another appearance in April 2010, and performed "This Too Shall Pass."

Personal life

In early 2008, Kulash wrote a passage in Ben Karlin's book Things I've Learnt from Women Who've Dumped Me. Kulash describes one of his previous, unsuccessful relationships, involving a dog which he shared with his partner.

On February 19, 2010, The New York Times printed his op-ed piece entitled "WhoseTube?", which discussed the relationship between musicians, record labels, and the Internet. Kulash had previously written two other op-eds in the New York Times: one in 2008 about Net Neutrality and another in 2005 about the Sony BMG CD copy protection scandal. He has also testified in Congress in favor of Net Neutrality.

Kulash was previously married to artist Shana Lutker and designer Ambra Medda. He is married to Kristin Gore; they attended high school together.

In March 2014, Kulash was part of a viral video, titled "First Kiss".

References

External links
PopGurls 20 Questions with Damian Kulash

American male singers
American rock singers
American rock guitarists
American male guitarists
Singers from Washington, D.C.
Brown University alumni
Living people
1975 births
Grammy Award winners
St. Albans School (Washington, D.C.) alumni
American indie rock musicians
OK Go members
American people of Polish descent
Guitarists from Washington, D.C.
21st-century American singers
8in8 members